Joseph T. Davis is a former professional footballer who played as a defender for Bristol Rovers and Swansea Town (now known as Swansea City).

Davis was discovered playing youth football for Soundwell, and was signed by Bristol Rovers in 1960. He spent seven years with The Pirates and played 211 League games, scoring four times, and was the club captain in the mid-1960s.

He moved to Swansea Town in March 1967, but suffered a career-ending Achilles tendon injury having made 38 league appearances for the Welsh club, whereupon he returned to Bristol Rovers as a youth development coach and scout. While coaching Rovers' youth players he worked with a group of players including Paul Randall, Gary Penrice and Ian Holloway.

After ten years working as a coach and scout Davis left Rovers in 1978 and became a newsagent for approximately 18 months, before working for the Bristol Evening Post where he remained for thirty years.

References

1938 births
Living people
Footballers from Bristol
English footballers
Association football defenders
English Football League players
Bristol Rovers F.C. players
Swansea City A.F.C. players